The Biplobi Shainik Sangstha (Revolutionary Soldier's Organisation) was a clandestine socialist group within the Bangladesh army, which was active from 1973 to 1975. The BSS was formed by Jatiya Samajtantrik Dal (JSD) and led by Major (dismissed) M.A. Jalil and Lt. Colonel (retired) Abu Taher. The BSS is known for organising the 7 November coup which enabled Ziaur Rahman to become president.

Foundation 
The BSS was founded on 1 January 1973 at the staff quarters of Havildar Bari, who was part of Armoured Corps. The members were mainly junior and non-commissioned officers, who pledged their allegiance to the BSS by touching a Quran. The group held secret meetings at the Ahsanullah Hall of Bangladesh University of Engineering and Technology (BUET). JSD founder Sirajul Alam Khan was present at these meetings. Meetings were also held at the house of Abu Taher's brother, Flight Sergeant Abu Yusuf Khan.

The BSS was popular among soldiers who served in Sector 11 during the Bangladesh Liberation War, as Abu Taher was one the commanders of Sector 11. The group was also popular among soldiers from Comilla cantonment, where Taher had once served as the commanding officer.

7 November Coup and twelve demands 
After the assassination of Sheikh Mujibur Rahman on 15 August 1975, Khondaker Mostaq Ahmed came to power. Under Mostaq's new government, the young army officers involved in Sheikh Mujib's assassination started 'acting like generals', breaking the army's chain of command. In response to this, General Khaled Mosharraf asked General Ziaur Rahman to restore the chain of command, which Zia was either unwilling or unable to do.

On 3 November, General Khaled Mosharraf, Colonel Nazmul Huda and Lt. Colonel A.T.M. Haider removed Mostaq from power and placed Zia under house arrest. Before Zia was detained, he called Taher, urging him to do something. In response to Zia's request, the BSS held secret meetings each night between 4 and 6 November, under the leadership of Taher. The group had two goals, namely to free Zia from imprisonment and to implement a list of twelve demands. The twelve demands were of a left-wing nature, as the opening line of the declaration read:"This revolution is for one purpose - the interests of the oppressed classes. For that, the entire structure of the armed forces must be changed. For many days we were the army of the richer class. The rich have used us for their own interests. The events of August 15 is but one example. However, this time we have revolted neither for the cause of the rich nor on their behalf. This time we have revolted alongside the masses of the country. From today onwards the armed forces of the nation shall build themselves as the defender of the country's oppressed classes".By midnight on 6 November, all the preparations for the uprising were complete. Subedar Mehboob fired a single shot during the early hours of 7 November, which signalled the start of the uprising. Soldiers looted the armouries and boarded trucks and jeeps to occupy key locations in Dhaka. Troops from Jessore and Comilla came to Dhaka, in support of the uprising. During the coup, thousands of civilians poured into the streets to support the soldiers and shouted slogans such as "The people and soldiers have united".

Soldiers belonging to the BSS freed Zia from imprisonment and took him to the headquarters of the 2nd Field Artillery regiment. When Taher arrived, Zia reportedly embraced him and thanked Taher for saving his life. "You have saved the nation", Zia also said. When the BSS presented their twelve demands to Zia, he reportedly signed a document, affirming his support for the demands. However, few of the demands would be met, as Zia had most of the leaders of the BSS arrested within a few weeks after the coup. Lawrence Lifschultz suggested that signing the document may have been a "tactical decision", meaning that Zia only signed it to keep the BSS satisfied on the day of the uprising.   

Khaled Mosharraf, Nazmul Huda and A.T.M. Haider were killed during the uprising when the three officers went to the headquarters of the 10 Bengal Regiment. An eyewitness claimed that Captain Jalil and Captain Asad of the 10 Bengal Regiment ordered their troops to kill the three officers. Anthony Mascarenhas suggested that either Captain Jalil or Captain Asad may have been influenced by Abu Taher.

Dissolution of the BSS 
Within a few weeks of the 7 November coup, Zia had the leaders of the uprising arrested. On 23 November, Abu Taher's brother, Flight Sergeant Abu Yusuf Khan was arrested. When Abu Taher tried to contact Zia, he was not available. Instead, the Deputy Chief Martial Law Administrator, Major General Hussain Muhammad Ershad, spoke with him. Ershad informed Taher that the arrest of his brother was a police matter, which Ershad knew nothing about. 

On 24 November, Taher himself was arrested and taken to Dhaka Central Jail. He was accused of 'instigating indiscipline' among the soldiers and organising a 'socialist revolution'. A total of 33 people were put on trial, including:

 Lt. Colonel (retired) Abu Taher (sentenced to death)
 Major (dismissed) M. A. Jalil (sentenced to death, later reduced to life imprisonment)
 Flight Sergeant Abu Yusuf Khan (sentenced to death, later reduced to life imprisonment)

Abu Taher was hanged on 21 July 1976, in Dhaka Central Jail. In 2013, a High Court verdict stated that the trial of Abu Taher was illegal and described it as a 'cold-blooded murder'.

References 

Socialism in Bangladesh